Panashe Madanha (born 5 August 2004), is a Zimbabwe-born Australian professional footballer who plays as a winger for Adelaide United. He made his professional debut in an  Australia Cup Round of 32 match against Newcastle Jets on 30 July 2022.

References

External links

2004 births
Living people
Australian soccer players
Zimbabwean footballers
Zimbabwean emigrants to Australia
Association football forwards
Adelaide United FC players
National Premier Leagues players
A-League Men players